Seung-ho is a Korean masculine given name. The meaning differs based on the hanja used to write each syllable of the name. There are 15 hanja with the reading "seung" and 49 hanja with the reading "ho" on the South Korean government's official list of hanja which may be used in given names.

People with this name include:
Kim Seung-ho (1917–1968), South Korean film actor
Choi Seungho (born 1954), South Korean poet
Lee Seung-ho (born 1976), South Korean baseball relief pitcher
An Seung-ho (born 1978), stage name Tony An, South Korean singer, member of boy band H.O.T.
Lee Seung-ho (born 1981), South Korean baseball relief pitcher
Yang Seung-ho (born 1987), South Korean singer, member of boy band MBLAQ
Choi Seung-ho (footballer) (born 1992), South Korean football midfielder (K-League Challenge)
Yoo Seung-ho (born 1993), South Korean actor

See also
List of Korean given names
 Sungho County

References

Korean masculine given names